Forstheim is a commune in the Bas-Rhin department in Grand Est in north-eastern France.

To the south and southwest the village is flanked by a wood. Otherwise, Forstheim is surrounded by arable farmland.

Between 1962 and 2006 the registered population rose from 487 to 539.

See also
 Communes of the Bas-Rhin department

References

Communes of Bas-Rhin